Jeanne Oddo-Deflou (1846–1915) was a French translator, educator and feminist. In 1898, she founded the Groupe français d'Etudes féministes, believing that while women's suffrage was the ultimate goal, it was important first to reform the underlying laws. From 1899, she was a member of the Ligue française pour le droit des femmes and from 1901 of Suffrage des femmes in support of votes for women. A delegate at various meetings of the International Congress of Women (London, Paris, Brussels, Berlin), she served as secretary for the Congrès des droits civils et du suffrage des femmes. In 1906, she published Le Sexualisme which called for women to have the right to develop in a spirit of "liberty, dignity and fullness".

References

External links

1846 births
1915 deaths
French feminists
French suffragists
Educators from Paris
19th-century French writers
French women writers
19th-century French translators
International Congress of Women people
20th-century French women